Dance Nation was a British independent record label which was a subsidiary of Ministry of Sound. When founded in 2007 it was known as Hard2Beat Records, and was rebranded to its current name in 2010.

The label's first release was "Now You're Gone" by Basshunter, and they have released other singles and compilation albums since then.

In April 2009 they held Dance Nation Live, a live arena tour across the UK. Basshunter headlined the tour with acts including Sash!, Lasgo, and Platnum.

Dance Nation had its own customized content channel on Audiotube.
The label brand was used as a Sky TV Channel in 2012, since it has not had any new releases or live tours. The official website went offline in April 2015 as well as all social media sites.

Artists
2007
Basshunter

2008
September
Sash
Headhunterz

2009
Ultra DJ's
Bad Behaviour
Wildstylez

2010
Flip & Fill
Kindervater
Forenzelli

Discography

Studio albums

Compilations

Singles

References

External links
 
 Hard2Beat Records at Discogs
 Hard2Beat Records at trackitdown
 Hard2Beat Records at Juno Downloads
 Dance Nation at Discogs

British record labels
Electronic music record labels
English electronic dance music record labels
Record labels based in London
Record labels established in 2007
Ministry of Sound
British brands